Saamy ( God) is a 2003 Indian Tamil-language action masala film written and directed by Hari. The film was presented by K. Balachander and produced by Pushpa Kandasamy under banner Kavithalayaa Productions. The film stars Vikram and Trisha and Kota Srinivasa Rao (debut in Tamil cinema) in a negative role. Music was composed by Harris Jayaraj. Upon release, the film was highly successful at the box office. It was remade in Telugu as Lakshmi Narasimha (2004) starring Nandamuri Balakrishna, in Bengali as Barood starring Mithun Chakraborty, loosely in Kannada as Ayya (2005) starring Darshan and later in Hindi as Policegiri (2013)(Directed by K.S. Ravikumar) starring Sanjay Dutt reprising the role of Vikram.

Like other films directed by Hari, this film also specialises a particular city and this time it is Tirunelveli. Saamy along with Kaakha Kaakha started a trend of police films in Tamil such as Bheeshmar, Gambeeram, Anjaneya and many others.  A sequel, Saamy Square, was released in 2018.

Plot
Aarusaamy Saamy arrives in Tirunelveli, who along with his friend, witnesses a corrupt cop trying to extort money from someone, he thrashes him, which prompts the police to arrive at the scene, and when they question Saamy, he reveals himself to be the new DCP of Tirunelveli city, while ordering the police to arrest the swindler posing as a cop. Saamy later assembles the police force and rules out their procedures that they can do whatever they wish, provided the public and the innocent are not harmed in the process. He also tells them to arrest any thug in the town without second thoughts.

Due to Saamy's administration, the crime rate in Tirunelveli decreases. At the outset, Saamy pretends to be a corrupt cop by accepting bribes from the influential and corrupt Politician Perumal Pichai under the condition that his illegal activities will not be monitored, while advising him to move his liquor stores elsewhere in order to avoid disturbance to the public. Perumal accepts, merely out of an assumption that Saamy belongs to his caste. Saamy falls in love with a college-going Brahmin girl Bhuvana, whose father Srinivasan, is a straightforward government officer who dislikes bribery and leads a noble life.

Saamy and Bhuvana meet each other when Saamy leaves with his assistant, Inspector Punctuality Paramasivam, in search of a home for rent. Bhuvana misinterprets Saamy and Paramasivam as thieves and locks them in a room, only to be revealed of their identities by the police. Soon their frequent rendezvous turn to love. One day, Saamy seals Perumal's gas station because the workers assaulted a woman and others when they challenged them a very less distribution of petrol than being promised. This infuriates Perumal, who storms into Saamy's quarters with Bhuvana being present, and they argue. Bhuvana gets upset when Perumal mentions the bribe Saamy had taken from him, leaving to her home.

The next day, Saamy tries to convince Bhuvana at the temple and reveals his past. Saamy's father Chokkalingam wanted to become a cop, but he was unable to due to corruption. So, he takes care of agriculture as his living, but he wanted to make his son a cop. Saamy passes the TNPSC Group 1 exams, but was asked for bribes. Chokkalingam mortgages his properties and makes him get police job. Being an honest cop, Saamy is honored with transfers all over Tamil Nadu due to political pressure. In Trichy, he is accused of bribery and gets suspended. After 6 months, Saamy proves his innocence, and is finally posted back to Tirunelveli, and adapts a new policy and also taking bribes from the influential persons, for the public's welfare.

Saamy also tells Bhuvana that the bribes are fully donated off by him. Bhuvana reconciles with Saamy, and after much coercion, Srinivasan agrees to their engagement. The ruling party calls for a one-day strike all over the state, and Perumal is to handle with the responsibility of Tirunelveli on the eve of Pongal. The retail vendors plead with Saamy to provide protection as Pongal festival is a very important sales time. Saamy takes steps to maintain law and order. The strike becomes a failure in Tirunelveli, which enrages Perumal. Perumal was waiting for a chance seek vengeance against Saamy for sealing his petrol bunk earlier. So, his henchmen attack the market on the day of Saamy and Bhuvana's marriage, since all the prime policemen would be attending the wedding.

Saamy witnesses the brutality of Perumal's men, and this incident begins their enmity. Saamy receives his transfer order to Dindigul, with 1 week duty remaining in the city. Saamy challenges to close Perumal's empire and finish him in that week, which he succeeds in doing so by using various enforcement tactics. Saamy arrests the main accomplies of Perumal, two of the MLAs and imprisons them for 15 day period. Saamy covertly kills off other main enforcers of Perumal in a riot caused by him during a procession. Saamy advises Bhuvana to leave for Pazhani. In the evening, after listening to Perumal's phone calls, Saamy realises that Perumal has planned to bomb somewhere.

Saamy meets with Perumal's henchman, whom he spared in the rally shooting, and convinces the henchman to turn approver. Saamy finds that the bomb is to be detonated in his house. Unknown to Saamy, Chokkalingam has arrived to his house from Pazhani. Despite Saamy's attempts to warn Chokalingam, the bomb detonates, and Chokalingam is killed. The bomb maker and Perumal's henchman provide statements to the magistrate, and Saamy is provided an arrest warrant against Perumal. Despite hurdles by the authorities and ministers to stop the arrest, Saamy leaves to arrest Perumal.

On the final day eve, Saamy gives news to the media, that Perumal has absconded, and police are searching for him. Saamy routes Perumal to his own sand quarry. After a brief fight, Perumal surrenders to Saamy and scoffs at him. Saamy refuses, and kills Perumal with his illicit revolver, and burns his corpse in a brick kiln nearby, so that no one will try to replace or avenge the absconding Perumal, and thus no harm done. Saamy then performs the rites for his deceased father.

Cast

Production
After directing the Tamil film.  Thamizh (2002),the production company, Kavithalayaa Productions called Hari  to direct a film for them since Hari assisted few of their films.  The film was titled as Saamy, with Vikram and Trisha as a lead pair; the latter was selected as the makers wanted a fresh pair opposite Vikram. Telugu actor Kota Srinivasa Rao was selected to play negative role making his debut in Tamil.

The film's shooting schedule took place at Karaikudi, Some fight scenes were shot at the busy lanes in Karaikudi where Vikram chased some rowdies and Pudichirukku song was Shot in New Zealand, The fight scene was shot for five days, with Priyan canning the shots and Super Subbarayan choreographing the fights. Vikram worked on his body for the film, sporting a thick waist to show notable differences from his other police film, Dhill and also put on eight kilograms.

Soundtrack

The soundtrack album and background score were composed by Harris Jayaraj. The lyrics for songs were written by Na. Muthukumar, Thamarai & Snehan and upon release the soundtrack received positive reviews from critics. Due to its popularity on the music charts, Harris Jayaraj was nominated for the Filmfare Best Music Director award.

Tamil track list

Telugu track list

Release

Critical reception
Sify wrote:"The patchy storyline merely serves as a pretext to spark off several skirmishes and bombastic dialogues. Ultimately it is Vikram who dominates this action movie. In fact he is the mainstay of the picture [sic] Director Hari packs in a sting, but Saamy is strictly for the no holds barred action addicts".Heroine Trisha also received praise from the critics:" Trisha is appealingly sensual and looks glamarous as the Brahmin girl Bhuvana and brings out the nuance of her character well." Bizhat called it:"taut, fully engaging actioner". Hindu wrote:"Kavithalaya's Saami should follow the Dhil, Dhool line. Vikram's daredevilry and macho appeal ought to go down well with the masses. His presence of mind and intelligence are bound to make an impression on those who expect something more".

Box office
Saamy was released approximately in 100 screens in Tamil Nadu. The film had a huge opening as it was a summer vacation for the Tamil audiences. Theatres in Chennai had almost 100% occupancies and the film recovered all its budget within 4 to 5 days. The film sold 1 crore tickets in Tamil Nadu box office netting 32 crore in its lifetime run.

Dubbed Versions and Remakes
The film was remade into Telugu in 2004 as Lakshmi Narasimha. It was also remade in Bengali as Barood (2004), in Kannada as Ayya (2005) and in Hindi as Policegiri (2013). Despite Telugu and Hindi remakes, Saamy was also dubbed and released in the former as Swamy IPS in 2008 and in the latter as Policewala Gunda 3 in 2016.

Sequel

In August 2016, during the audio launch of Iru Mugan, director Hari made an official announcement that he will unite with Vikram, also echoed by the latter, for a sequel to Saamy. Later the sequel named as Saamy Square.

References

External links
 

2000s masala films
2003 films
Films shot in Tiruchirappalli
Tamil films remade in other languages
Fictional portrayals of the Tamil Nadu Police
Films shot in New Zealand
Films directed by Hari (director)
2000s Tamil-language films
Films shot in Tirunelveli
Films scored by Harris Jayaraj
Indian police films
Indian action drama films
Films set in Tiruchirappalli
Films shot in Karaikudi
2003 action drama films